The Haddon Heights School District is a comprehensive community public school district that serves students in pre-kindergarten through twelfth grade from Haddon Heights, in Camden County, New Jersey, United States.

As of the 2020–21 school year, the district, comprised of four schools, had an enrollment of 1,519 students and 132.3 classroom teachers (on an FTE basis), for a student–teacher ratio of 11.5:1.

The district is classified by the New Jersey Department of Education as being in District Factor Group "GH", the third-highest of eight groupings. District Factor Groups organize districts statewide to allow comparison by common socioeconomic characteristics of the local districts. From lowest socioeconomic status to highest, the categories are A, B, CD, DE, FG, GH, I and J.

The districts' high school also serves students from the neighboring communities of Barrington, Lawnside and Merchantville, who attend the high school as part of sending/receiving relationships. The Haddon Heights district approved an agreement with the Merchantville School District in September 2013 that would add nearly 80 students a year from Merchantville to the high school, in addition to the average of more than 260 students from Barrington and 120 from Lawnside that are sent to Haddon Heights each year. The plan was approved by the Commissioner of the New Jersey Department of Education, and students from Merchantville began attending the school in September 2015. Students from Merchantville already in high school before 2015 will continue to attend Pennsauken High School until their graduation, as part of a longstanding sending/receiving relationship with the Pennsauken Public Schools in Pennsauken Township.

Schools
Schools in the district (with 2020–21 enrollment data from the National Center for Education Statistics) are: 
Elementary schools
Atlantic Avenue Elementary School with 127 students in grades PreK-6
Christopher Ormsby, Principal
Glenview Elementary School with 262 students in grades K-6
Eric Rosen, Principal
Seventh Avenue Elementary School with 128 students in grades K-6
Christopher Ormsby, Principal
Junior/senior high school
Haddon Heights Junior/Senior High School with 997 students in grades 7-12
Karim Fisher, Principal

Administration
Core members of the school administration are:
Carla Bittner, Superintendent
Michael Sloan, Business Administrator / Board Secretary

Board of education
The district's board of education, comprised of nine members, sets policy and oversees the fiscal and educational operation of the district through its administration. As a Type II school district, the board's trustees are elected directly by voters to serve three-year terms of office on a staggered basis, with three seats up for election each year held (since 2013) as part of the November general election. The board appoints a superintendent to oversee the district's day-to-day operations and a business administrator to supervise the business functions of the district. Barrington, Lawnside and Merchantville each have appointed representatives to represent the interests of their respective districts on the Haddon Heights school board.

References

External links

 
School Data for the Haddon Heights School District, National Center for Education Statistics

Haddon Heights, New Jersey
New Jersey District Factor Group GH
School districts in Camden County, New Jersey